Alan Williams (born 1948) is an English male former track cyclist.

Cycling career
Williams became British champion when winning the British National Individual Sprint Championships in 1976.

References

1948 births
British male cyclists
British track cyclists
Living people